Everlasting Moments is a 2008 Swedish drama film directed by Jan Troell, starring Maria Heiskanen, Mikael Persbrandt and Jesper Christensen. It is based on the true story of Maria Larsson, a Swedish working class woman in the early 20th century, who wins a camera in a lottery and goes on to become a photographer. It has been compared to Troell's previous films Here's Your Life and As White as in Snow, which are both set around the same period.

The film won the Guldbagge Award for Best Film and was nominated for Best Foreign Language Film at the 66th Golden Globe Awards. It also made the January shortlist for Best Foreign Language Film at the 81st Academy Awards, but it was not selected as one of the final nominees.

Plot
Maria, a Finn in Sweden, wins a valuable Contessa camera in a lottery with a man named Sigfrid Larsson, and they agree to marry to share the prize. They have numerous children. In the early 1900s, Maria takes the camera to a shop owned by the Danish-Swede Sebastian Pedersen, looking to see what price she can get if she sells it. Mr. Pederson promises to give her an estimate, and takes her photo as she leaves. When she returns to the shop, she is amazed to see the photograph of herself, and wonders how the technology works. Mr. Pederson gives her some explanation as to photography and imagery. He then gives her updated camera equipment to go with the Contessa.

Though she has no money to pay for the equipment, Mr. Pederson accepts the camera itself as payment, allowing her to use it though he owns it. She uses the camera to photograph her four children, telling them not to tell anyone, including Sigfrid. She then uses it for post-mortem photography on a girl named Ingeborg, giving a copy to Ingeborg's mother for free. Maria shows another copy of the memorial photograph to Mr. Pederson. Impressed by Maria's natural talent and vision, he accepts the photograph as payment for the Contessa. When Sigfrid is briefly arrested after an explosion during a strike killed one and injured six strikebreakers, Maria reveals the photograph of the children to him. He is later released after a witness confirms his non-involvement.

Five years later in 1914, the Great War breaks across Europe to the south of Sweden, and Maria, who has fallen out of touch with Pederson, shows up at his shop again to discuss taking photos of uniformed men. The monarchs of Scandinavia meet to discuss how to keep their countries out of the conflict, with Maria attending and taking a photograph of the kings' public appearance. She is shocked to learn her photograph of the monarchs was purchased and published by a newspaper. As the children learn more about the Ten Commandments, including Thou shalt not commit adultery, they note Sigfrid's womanizing and Maria's friendship to Mr. Pederson.

Mr. Pederson takes a portrait photograph of Maria, and they move to first-name basis. Sigfrid sees the photograph, and enraged, takes it as proof of being cuckolded by Sebastian. He violently confronts Maria, even though she points out his relationships with women. After an incident of marital rape, Maria carries out a self-induced abortion. When Maria and the children enjoy seeing a Charlie Chaplin film, Sigfrid becomes enraged again at his belief his children are being taken away from him. He puts a knife to her throat, and while he does not kill her, he receives another longer prison sentence. While he is away, the children urge Maria to separate from him, arguing the household is better off without Sigfrid. Sigfrid is later released and Maria reconciles with him, though Maja expresses bewilderment as to why. Shortly after a social outing, Maria dies. Years later, Maja discovers Maria's only self-portrait, taken in a mirror between the outing and her death.

Cast

Production
With financing from 26 organisations from five different countries; Sweden, Denmark, Norway, Finland and Germany; the film was Troell's largest project since The Emigrants in the early 1970s. Agneta Ulfsäter-Troell, Jan Troell's wife, started doing research and interviews in 1986 with Maja Larsson, Maria Larsson's daughter, who was a cousin to Ulfsäter-Troell's father. During her research she found Maria's pictures, which were used as inspiration for the pictures seen in the film. The material wasn't organized, but when a person at the Swedish Film Institute heard about the story and how Jan Troell was interested in turning it into a film, an early process for a manuscript was started.

The first official meeting took place in early 2004. Troell said that the casting choice of Maria Heiskanen and Jesper Christensen, both of whom had starred in Troell films previously, had always been "obvious." Two years before filming started, Troell met Mikael Persbrandt at a film festival in Sweden and started to imagine him in the role of Sigfrid. Persbrandt then contacted Troell himself and persuaded him into giving him the role. A major difference between the film and the actual story is that the real Maria Larsson lived in Gothenburg, while the film takes place in Malmö, where Jan Troell himself comes from.

Filming took place between 26 February and 1 June 2007 in Malmö and Luleå, Sweden, and Vilnius, Lithuania. The film was shot on 16 mm film, and then blown up to 35 mm. "Then you get a little grainy picture that fits the turn of the [20th] century era and also relates to the early silent cinema. I have deliberately kept the colours down and used similar sepia tones as those in for example Victor Sjöström's films," Troell explains this idea.

Release
The film premiered as part of the Masters selection at the 2008 Toronto International Film Festival. On 24 September the same year it was released in Sweden. IFC Films acquired the American distribution rights and gave the film a limited release on 6 March 2009. At its peak it was running in 30 theatres during the same weekend. It was released in the United Kingdom on 22 May 2009 through Icon Film. A US DVD and Blu-ray was released in June 2010 through The Criterion Collection, as part of a collaboration between The Criterion Collection and IFC Films.

Reception
The film has a 91% "fresh" rating at Rotten Tomatoes based on 97 reviews, with an average rating of 7.5 out of 10. The average rating from 21 reviews collected at the Swedish-language site Kritiker.se was 4.0 out of 5.

Accolades
In addition to the awards and nominations, Everlasting Moments was also Sweden's submission for the Academy Award for Best Foreign Language Film at the 81st Academy Awards. It was among the nine films that made it to the January shortlist, but was not selected as one of the final nominees.

References

External links
 
 
 
 
 
 
Everlasting Moments: Ways of Seeing an essay by Armond White at the Criterion Collection

2008 films
2000s Swedish-language films
Films directed by Jan Troell
Best Film Guldbagge Award winners
Swedish historical drama films
Icon Productions films
2000s historical drama films
2000s Swedish films